Mikhail Zaitsev's shrew (Crocidura zaitsevi) is a species of mammal in the family Soricidae. It is endemic to Vietnam.

Distribution 
The species is restricted to Ngoc Linh mountain in the Vietnamese province of Kon Tum. This species is named after the late Russian general Mikhail Zaitsev (1923–2009). Along with Crocidura sokolovi, this species is endemic to Ngoc Linh.

References 

Crocidura
Mammals of Vietnam
Endemic fauna of Vietnam
Mammals described in 2007